Dean Huiberts (born 16 May 2000) is a Dutch professional footballer who plays as a midfielder for Eerste Divisie club PEC Zwolle.

Career
Huiberts played youth football for DOS Kampen and Twente, before moving to the academy of PEC Zwolle in 2018. On 14 June 2019, he signed his first professional contract with PEC Zwolle. He made his professional debut with PEC Zwolle in a 3–1 Eredivisie loss to FC Utrecht on 11 August 2019.

Personal life
Huiberts is the nephew of the Dutch former footballer Max Huiberts.

References

External links
 
 Career stats & Profile - Voetbal International

2000 births
Living people
Dutch footballers
Footballers from Emmen, Netherlands
Association football midfielders
Eredivisie players
Eerste Divisie players
FC Twente players
PEC Zwolle players